Lars Bünning (born 27 February 1998) is a German professional footballer who plays as a centre-back for 1. FC Kaiserslautern.

Career
A Werder Bremen youth product, Bünning made his senior debut with the club's reserves and played in the 3. Liga.

In July 2020, after a season with Borussia Dortmund II in the Regionalliga West, he joined 3. Liga side SV Meppen.

References

1998 births
Living people
Footballers from Hamburg
German footballers
Association football central defenders
SV Werder Bremen II players
Borussia Dortmund II players
SV Meppen players
1. FC Kaiserslautern players
3. Liga players
Regionalliga players